The Eskişehir Football League was founded as a regional football league for Eskişehir based clubs in 1924. Although it was held a few years before 1924 already, it gained official status in 1924 as the national football association was founded in 1923 and began organising the regional leagues. In the period from 1924 to 1935, the winners of the Eskişehir League qualified for the former Turkish Football Championship. In 1940 Eskişehir Demirspor won the Turkish championship against Fenerbahçe, marking a turning point in Turkish football as clubs from Istanbul, Ankara, and İzmir were the dominating sides in those decades. By achieving this feat, they were included in the 1941 National Division, which included only the clubs of the three major regional leagues until that point.

In the following period from 1941 to 1951, the Eskişehir league winners qualified for the qualifying stages of the Turkish Championship. After the introduction of the professional nationwide league in 1959, the league lost its first level status. Eskişehir Demirspor hold the record with 22 championship titles won.

Participated teams
The following teams participated in the league regularly for at least a few years: 
 Eskişehir Demirspor
 Eskişehir İdman Yurdu
 Eskişehir Gençlerbirliği
 Eskişehir Altay
 Eskişehir Tayyare Yurdu
 Havagücü
 Hava Harp Okulu
 Eskişehir Şekerspor

Champions

Performance by club

References
 
 

Defunct football leagues in Turkey
Sport in Eskişehir
1924 establishments in Turkey
Sports leagues established in 1924